Liriope muscari is a species of flowering plant from East Asia. Common names in English include big blue lilyturf, lilyturf, border grass, and monkey grass. This small herbaceous perennial has grass-like evergreen foliage and lilac-purple flowers which produce single-seeded berries on a spike in the fall.  It is invasive to North America and considered a threat to native wildlife.

Description

Roots are fibrous, often with terminal tubers. The small, showy flowers occur on erect spikes with tiered whorls of dense, white to violet-purple flowers rising above the leaves in late summer. Flowers resemble those of grape hyacinth (Muscari), which is the origin of the specific epithet. Flowers develop into blackish berries which often persist into winter. Lilyturf is deer resistant. There is considerable variation in leaf color and size among a number of recognized cultivars.

Distinguishing characteristics
Distinguishing species in the genus Liriope is difficult at best, and mistaken identity occurs in commercial nurseries. 

The species is easily grown in average, medium, well-drained soils in full sun to part shade. Ideal conditions are moist, fertile soils with partial shade. However, lilyturf tolerates a wide range of light and soil conditions. Lilyturf is also tolerant of heat, humidity, and drought. The evergreen foliage often turns brown in late winter; old foliage can be cut back or mowed at a high setting before new shoots appear early spring. Lilyturf is suitable for USDA Hardiness Zones 6 to 10.  It might be grown in zone 5 in sheltered locations or if protected during severe winter weather.

Propagation

Seeds
The plant is difficult to reproduce from seed due to several factors.
 The fruit's pulp contains phenolic compounds which inhibit germination, and thus needs to be removed to promote germination. In addition, seeds have a morphological dormancy because the embryo is not fully developed when the fruit ripens; a period of warm stratification is required to complete maturation. Lastly, the seeds do not store well.  Cleaned seeds can be sown outdoors after the fruit ripens in early fall, recognizing that germination will be slow the following spring. Rapid germination can be promoted by warm, moist stratification of cleaned seed under dark conditions for 8 weeks at 77 degrees F (25 degrees C) for optimum germination. Stratified seeds can be started indoors or in a heated greenhouse during the dormant season or they may be sown outdoors after the threat of frost has passed.

Division
Lilyturf is easily reproduced by dividing the root mass.  The optimum time to do this is during the dormant season before onset of new growth. Plants produced by division are identical to the mother plant; thus cultivar traits will be retained.

Problems
No serious diseases or pests occur for cultivated Liriope muscari.  Root rot (Pythium) has been reported. Anthracnose fungus sometimes causes reddish streaks in the leaves. Scale insects have been reported to cause unsightly reddish spots on leaves during late summer.  Slugs and snails are occasional pests.

Some people feel that lilyturf in the United States has been overused as a landscaping plant and that functionally suitable native plants such as Florida gamagrass can be used in its place.  Lilyturf is reported to have little wildlife value.

Other uses
The roots, which often have fleshy tubers near their tip, are used in traditional Chinese medicine.

References

Other online resources

Missouri Botanical Garden: Kemper Center for Home Gardening: Liriope muscari.
Fan District Association of Richmond, Virginia: Everything you wanted to know about ground cover in the tree out front--Liriope.

Nolinoideae
Flora of Asia
Plants used in traditional Chinese medicine
Garden plants of Asia
Groundcovers
Taxa named by Joseph Decaisne